René Neyer (born 4 August 1961) is a Swiss wrestler. He competed at the 1984 Summer Olympics and the 1988 Summer Olympics.

References

1961 births
Living people
Swiss male sport wrestlers
Olympic wrestlers of Switzerland
Wrestlers at the 1984 Summer Olympics
Wrestlers at the 1988 Summer Olympics
Place of birth missing (living people)
20th-century Swiss people